is an amusement park consisting of an aquarium, shopping mall, hotel and marina. It is located in the city of Sasebo, Nagasaki Prefecture, Japan. It opened for business on July 20, 1994.

Facilities

Marine facilities
Sailing aboard: The Pearl Queen and Kaiō cruise ferry sailing to the Kujū-ku Islands in 50 minutes.
Marina: You can experience eco boats, yacht sailing and sea kayak.
Umi Kirara Saikai National Park Aquarium
Jellyfish Symphony Dome - Listen to a healing symphony which weaves mysterious jellyfish, fantastic lights, peaceful music, and elegantly floating jellyfish all together.
Kujūkushima Bay Large Aquarium - The Kujūkushima Bay Large Aquarium contains 13,000 creatures (120 types), and it is possible to view these creatures just like you were walking in the sea.
Kujūkushima Dulphin Pool - At the Kujūkushima dolphin pool visitors can watch its cute dolphins against the backdrop of Kujūkushima.

History
July 20, 1994: Open for business.
July 20, 2002: The Pearl Queen Kujū-ku Islands cruise ferry began.
August 31, 2008: The facility was closed for reconstructed the buildings. 
July 18, 2009: The facility was reopened to the public.

Admission fees
Umi Kirara Aquarium:¥1400 adults, ¥700 children
Pearl Queen and Kaiō Kujūkushima Excursion Boats:¥1200 adults, ¥600 children
Eco Boat Matsuura:¥2000 adults, ¥1000 children
Sea kayak:¥500 single, ¥1000 double
Kujūkushima Yacht Sailing:¥2500 adults, ¥1500 children

Access
Take a city bus from Sasebo Station, get off at Pearl Sea Resort / Kujūkushima Aquarium bus stop. The journey takes approximately 25 minutes.
There is a rapid shuttle service (separate fee) which coincides with JR limited express Midori and takes approximately 18 minutes (runs between Sasebo Station and Saikai Pearl Sea Resort).

External links
 Official Site 
 Official Site 

Amusement parks in Japan
1994 establishments in Japan
Tourist attractions in Nagasaki Prefecture
Museums in Nagasaki Prefecture
Buildings and structures in Nagasaki Prefecture
Amusement parks opened in 1994
Postmodern architecture in Japan